The Augusta Country Club (ACC) is a country club and golf course in Augusta, Georgia.  It is located immediately adjacent to the more famous Augusta National Golf Club (ANGC). It also borders on the Sands Hill Historic District, which is listed on the National Register of Historic Places as a historic African-American community.

History 
In 1897, the 9-hole golf course known as the Bon Air Golf Club was designed by Donald Ross. In 1901, the course was expanded to 18-holes and then became known as the Augusta Country Club.

In 1930, ACC held their first major national golf championship, the Southeastern Open, where amateur Bobby Jones defeated professional Horton Smith.

In 2001, ACC successfully completed a restoration based on original 1927 Donald Ross sketches from the Tufts Archives in Pinehurst, North Carolina, which is how it remains today.

On August 4, 2017, ANGC bought land from ACC. As part of their deal, AGNC paid to redesign the ACC's 8th and 9th holes.

References

External links 
 Official Website
Job Application for ACC General Manager

Augusta, Georgia
Richmond County, Georgia
Golf clubs and courses in Georgia (U.S. state)
Golf clubs and courses designed by Donald Ross